Angad Paul (6 June 1970 – 8 November 2015) was a British businessman and film producer.

Background and education
Paul was born on 6 June 1970, the youngest son of the billionaire entrepreneur and politician Swraj Paul, Baron Paul. He attended Harrow School and received a degree in economics from the Massachusetts Institute of Technology.

Career
He was CEO of Caparo Industries, having taken over from his father in 1996. He also produced films, including  Lock, Stock and Two Smoking Barrels, Snatch,  and The Tournament.

Personal life
In March 2005, Paul was married to media lawyer Michelle Bonn in a ceremony held at Lancaster House. They had two children.

Death
Paul died on 8 November 2015 after falling from his penthouse home, an eight-storey building in Portland Place, central London. The police stated that there were no suspicious circumstances.

Nearly three years after Paul's death, the Angad Arts Hotel, named after him, opened in St. Louis, US.

In 2016 the movie Eddie the Eagle was dedicated to Paul. "In Memory Of Our Friend Angad Paul" read at the top of the credits. The movie was directed by Dexter Fletcher and produced by Matthew Vaughn, who were part of the team that worked with Paul when he produced 'Lock, Stock and Two Smoking Barrels' in 1998.

References

External links
 

1970 births
2015 suicides
British film producers
MIT School of Humanities, Arts, and Social Sciences alumni
Businesspeople from London
British people of Indian descent
People educated at Harrow School
Sons of life peers
Deaths from falls
Suicides in Westminster
Suicides by jumping in the United Kingdom
20th-century English businesspeople